Vicumpriya Perera (Sinhala: විකුම්ප්‍රිය පෙරේරා) is a Sri Lankan born mathematician, lyricist, poet and music producer. He has published two books of Sinhala poetry, Mekunu Satahan (Sinhala: මැකුනු සටහන්) in 2001 and Paa Satahan (Sinhala: පා සටහන්) in 2013. He has written over 200 songs and has produced eleven Sinhala song albums. He currently works as a mathematics professor in Ohio, US.

Life and career

Vicumpriya Perera is originally from Wattala, Sri Lanka. He is a graduate of St. Anthony's College, Wattala and Ananda College, Maradana, Sri Lanka. He received a Bachelor of Science degree in Mathematics with first class honors from University of Colombo, Sri Lanka and continued his graduate studies at Indiana University - Purdue University at Indianapolis. He obtained a doctorate degree from Purdue University in Pure Mathematics with research concentrating on operator algebras and functional analysis in 1993.

Vicumpriya Perera lives in Ohio, US, where he has worked as a mathematics professor at Kent State University (Trumbull campus) since 1998. He works in operator algebra, which is an area of pure mathematics.

List of albums
The following is a list of the songs albums that Vicumpriya Perera has produced. Vicumpriya Perera was the sole composer of the lyrics of all of them.

Siththaruwanani included songs from the sinhala classical musical genre (sarala gee). Instrumentalists for this album consisted of Sri Lankan musicians Mahendra Pasquel, Sarath Fernando, Dhananjaya Somasiri, Janaka Bogoda, Susil Amarasinghe, Rohana Dharmakeerthi, Shelton Wijesekera, and Dilusha Ravindranath.

Other productions
In 2005, Vicumpriya Perera (along with Nalin Jayawardena, and Jaanaka Wimaladharma) produced a compact disc set, Dhammapadaya (Sinhala: ධම්මපදය),  under the Lanka Heritage label. The set contained four discs, and consisted of  complete the Dhammapada stanzas in the original Pali language followed by the Sinhala translations chanted by venerable Beruwala Siri Sobhitha Thero of the Sri Lanka Buddhist Vihara in Perth, Australia. In 2006, this disc set had an English release called Dhammapada. This version had the original Dhammapada stanzas (again in Pali) followed by the English translations written and rendered by Dr. Gil Fronsdal, director and resident teacher Insight Meditation Center, Redwood City, California, US.

In 2012 Vicumpriya Perera (in collaboration with Nalin Jayawardena) produced a Sinhala Audiobook called  Kulageyin Kulageyata (Sinhala: කුලගෙයින් කුලගෙයට) under the Lanka Heritage, LLC. The book was written in 2009 by Bhadraji Mahinda Jayatilaka, who provided most of the voice work . The audiobook has a total length of five compact discs, and was published by Sarasavi Publishers, Nugegoda, Sri Lanka.

Notes

References

External links
Lyrics of Vicumpriya Perera 
Vicumpriya Perera music on Google Play
Home Page of Insight Meditation Center of Redwood City, CA

Alumni of Ananda College
Living people
Sinhala-language poets
Sinhalese poets
Sinhalese scientists
Sri Lankan Buddhists
Sri Lankan lyricists
Sri Lankan mathematicians
Sri Lankan poets
Sri Lankan songwriters
Year of birth missing (living people)